Windows 10 November Update (also known as version 1511 and codenamed "Threshold 2") is the first major update to Windows 10 and the second version of the operating system. It carries the build number 10.0.10586.

PC version history
New features in this version of Windows 10 include:

Pre-installed Skype video, messaging, and phone apps
Tab previews and syncing in Microsoft Edge
Visual and functional tweaks

The first preview was released on August 18, 2015. The final release was made available to Windows Insiders on November 3, 2015, followed by a public release on November 12, 2015. Unlike the initial release of Windows, this branch was also made available to existing Windows Phone 8.1 devices and the Xbox One and as a preview release to Windows Server 2016, and was pre-installed on new Windows 10 Mobile devices. Support of this version for users of the Current Branch (CB) and Current Branch for Business (CBB) ended on October 10, 2017.

The update reached end of service after the release of build 10586.1540 on April 10, 2018.

Mobile version history

See also
Windows 10 version history
Windows 10 Mobile version history

References

Windows 10
History of Microsoft
Software version histories